Janjgir–Champa district is a district in the Indian state of Chhattisgarh. The district headquarters of the district Janjgir–Champa, Janjgir, is the city of Maharaja Jajawalya Dev of the Kalachuri dynasty. Earlier a part of the Bilaspur district, Jangir was carved out in 1998 to a separate district of its own, and ran to a political controversy about the name of the freshly minted district, which it carries to date as the name "Janjgir–Champa". Inhabitants are generally migrants from nearby villages.

The present collector of Janjgir-Champa is Shri Jitendra Kumar Shukla.

History
The Janjgir–Champa district, which is best known as the heart of Chhattisgarh because of its central location in state, was established on 25 May 1998. The Vishnu Mandir of the district reflects its golden past. Janjgir- Champa is also a place where one can find a number of temples having very versatile history.

Geography
The district is located in the central area of Chhattisgarh. It is bordered on the east by Sakti district, on the north by Korba district, on the west by Bilaspur district and on the south by Baloda Bazar district. The Hasdeo–Bango project has been considered as life supporting canal for this district. Under this project 3/4 area of the district will be covered for irrigation. The district headquarters of Janjgir–Champa is Janjgir, which is situated on National Highway 49.

Administrative divisions
Janjgir–Champa district is divided into three subdivisions: Champa, Janjgir and Pamgarh.

There are nine tehsils in Janjgir-Champa: Akaltara, Baloda, Champa, Janjgir, Nawagarh, Pamgarh, Shivrinarayan, Bamhanidih, Saragaon.

There are five blocks/janpad panchayats: Akaltara, Baloda, Bamhindih, Nawagarh and Pamgarh.

Economy 

Janjgir–Champa district is one of the fastest growing district of India, as 52 power plants are being opened in the district. Janjgir is going to become the "power hub" of the country, which will supply 15 to 20 thousand megawatt electricity. KSK Energy Venture (6 x 600 MW) which is 2nd biggest private thermal power plant of Asia, is one of the major thermal power plant of the district.

Janjgir–Champa district is a major producer of food grains in the state. It is a major hub for agricultural trade and a major local market for fresh farm supplies and the district is also famous for limestone.

Cottage industries such as Kosa sarees (Silk), Kansa (Bronze Utensils) & Kanchan (Gold Jewelry) trading and manufacturing work have been done from ancient times.

Transport

Railway 
District headquarters Janjgir is connected with Rail Line of South-Eastern Central Railway. It is situated on Howrah—Mumbai main line. The main railway stations of district Janjgir–Champa are Champa, Janjgir-Naila, Akaltara. The railway station of Janjgir is called Janjgir-Naila after the part of the town in which it is located. Where as Champa JN is A-category Station.

Demographics

According to the 2011 census Janjgir–Champa has a population of 1,619,707, roughly equal to the nation of Guinea-Bissau or the US state of Idaho. This gives it a ranking of 308th in India (out of a total of 640). Its population growth rate over the decade 2001-2011 was  23.01%. Janjgir–Champa has a sex ratio of 991 females for every 1,000 males, and a literacy rate of 73.7%.

After bifurcation, the district had a population of 966,671. 16.92% of the population lives in urban areas. Scheduled Castes and Scheduled Tribes make up 249,522 (25.81%) and 82,900 (8.58%) of the population respectively.

At the time of the 2011 Census of India, 94.16% of the population in the district spoke Chhattisgarhi and 4.30% Hindi as their first language.

Culture

One of the most popular religious sites in the district is Shivarinarayan. According to tradition, it was here where Shabari had her ashram. According to the Ramayana, during his exile, Rama encountered Sabari and ate the little food which she could offer him.

Janjgir has been the residence of Annie Funk, a Christian Missionary who lost her life in Titanic. Her house still lies deserted in the city and people often visit the ruins of her house. Further, the Nahariya Baba Temple, a temple dedicated to Lord Hanuman has always been a place of interest for the tourists. Manka Devi Mandir of Khokhra is also a peaceful and nice place of district located between two big ponds. Major tourist places and religious pilgrims are Madanpurgarh, Rishabhtirth, and Vishnu Temple(Janjgir), Shivarinarayan,  Pithampur (Kaleshwarnath Temple), Chandrapur (Chandrahasini Temple and Mahanadi river), Adbhar (Ashtabhuji Temple), Samleshwari Temple (Champa). Lord Hanuman Temple (Mehandi) and Kharod (Laxmenshwar temple).

Janjgir Champa District Urban Population 2011
Out of the total Janjgir Champa population for 2011 census, 13.90 percent lives in urban regions of district. In total 225,061 people lives in urban areas of which males are 114,316 and females are 110,745. Sex Ratio in urban region of Janjgir Champa district is 969 as per 2011 census data. Similarly child sex ratio in Janjgir Champa district was 923 in 2011 census. Child population (0-6) in urban region was 29,166 of which males and females were 15,169 and 13,997. This child population figure of Janjgir Champa district is 13.27% of total urban population. Average literacy rate in Janjgir Champa district as per census 2011 is 81.80% of which males and females are 90.71% and 72.66% literates respectively. In actual number 160,234 people are literate in urban region of which males and females are 89,935 and 70,299 respectively.

Janjgir Champa District Rural Population 2011
As per 2011 census, 86.10% population of Janjgir Champa districts lives in rural areas of villages. The total Janjgir Champa district population living in rural areas is 1,394,646 of which males and females are 701,401 and 693,245 respectively. In rural areas of Janjgir Champa district, sex ratio is 988 females per 1000 males. If child sex ratio data of Janjgir Champa district is considered, figure is 955 girls per 1000 boys. Child population in the age 0-6 is 195,052 in rural areas of which males were 99,788 and females were 95,264. The child population comprises 14.23% of total rural population of Janjgir Champa district. Literacy rate in rural areas of Janjgir Champa district is 71.64% as per census data 2011. Gender wise, male and female literacy stood at 83.73 and 59.48 percent respectively. In total, 859,400 people were literate of which males and females were 503,744 and 355,656 respectively.

References

External links
 Janjgir Facebook
 Official website
 Janjgir website
 Map of Janjgir

Districts of Chhattisgarh
 
1998 establishments in Madhya Pradesh